Khirbat Badran is a town in the Amman Governorate of north-western Jordan.

References

External links
Satellite map at Maplandia.com

Populated places in Amman Governorate